Pre-trial detention, also known as preventive detention, provisional detention, or Remand is the process of detaining a person until their trial after they have been arrested and charged with an offence. A person who is on remand is held in a prison or detention centre or held under house arrest. Varying terminology is used, but "remand" is generally used in common law jurisdictions and "preventive detention" elsewhere. However, in the United States, "remand" is rare except in official documents and "kept in custody until trial" is used in the media and even by judges and lawyers in addressing the public. Detention before charge is referred to as custody and continued detention after conviction is referred to as imprisonment.

Because imprisonment without trial is contrary to the presumption of innocence, pretrial detention in liberal democracies is usually subject to safeguards and restrictions. Typically, a suspect will be remanded only if it is likely that he or she could commit a serious crime, interfere with the investigation, or fail to come to the trial. In the majority of court cases, the suspect will not be in detention while awaiting trial, often with restrictions such as bail.

Research on pre-trial detention in the United States has found that pre-trial detention increases the likelihood of convictions, primarily because individuals who would otherwise be acquitted or have their charges dropped enter guilty pleas. A 2021 review of existing research found that "the current pretrial system [in the US] imposes substantial short- and long-term economic harms on detained defendants in terms of lost earnings and government assistance, while providing little in the way of decreased criminal activity for the public interest... the costs of cash bail and pretrial detention are disproportionately borne by Black and Hispanic individuals, giving rise to large and unfair racial differences in cash bail and detention that cannot be explained by underlying differences in pretrial misconduct risk."

Detention before charge or trial 
The pre-charge detention period is the period of time during which an individual can be held and questioned by police, prior to being charged with an offence. Not all countries have such a concept, and in those that do, the period for which a person may be detained without charge varies by jurisdiction.

The prohibition of prolonged detention without charge, habeas corpus, was first introduced in England about a century after the 1215 Magna Carta; the use of habeas corpus ad subjiciendum in 1305 was cited by William Blackstone.

Czech Republic  

Under Article 8 of the Charter of Fundamental Rights and Basic Freedoms of the Czech Republic, which has the same legal standing as the Czech Constitution, a suspect must be immediately familiarised with the grounds of detention, must be interviewed and within 48 hours either released or charged and handed over to a court. The court then has a further 24 hours either to order a custody, or to release the person detained.

Detailed rules of detention are included in the Criminal Procedural Code. The police may arrest and detain a suspect after obtaining prosecutor's consent. In an urgent case the police may detain a suspect without the consent. In both cases, however, the police detention may take place only when grounds for pre-trial detention exist (see below).  The statutory limits of 48 + 24 hours must be complied with and reaching the time limit should aways trigger immediate release, unless a court has ordered pre-trial custody.

Anybody may detain a person, who was caught while perpetrating a crime (not a misdemeanor) or immediately after it, when capturing of the perpetrator is necessary to either ascertain the perpetrator's identity or to prevent the perpetrator from escaping or to secure evidence. The perpetrator must immediately be handed over to the police, or when that is not possible, detention of the perpetrator must be immediately reported to the police.

People’s Republic of China

According to the reply of Supreme People's Court, detention refers to the detention of Suspect, Defendant in a specific place in accordance with the law, restricting or temporarily depriving them  Compulsory measures for personal freedom include arrest and detention.
Criminal detention is when public security department and Prosecutor’s Office are dealing with criminal cases, the current criminals or major suspects are temporarily deprived of their personal freedom and detained in a statutory emergency situation, and  One way to conduct a review.

Requirements 
Chinese public security department can first detain current criminals or major suspects in one of the following situations:.
 Preparing to commit a crime, committing a crime, or being discovered immediately after the crime.
 The victim or the person who saw it with his own eyes identified that he committed a crime.
 A crime Evidence is found around or in the residence.
 Attempt to suicide, run away or at large after committing a crime.
 There is a possibility of destruction, forged evidence or collusion of confession.
Does not tell the real name and address, and the identity is unknown.
 There are frequent crimes, multiple crimes, gang crime major suspects.

In addition to the authority of the public security organs to decide and enforce detention in accordance with the law, the People’s Procuratorate also has the right to decide to detain criminal suspects and defendants in the following two situations in cases directly accepted by the People’s Procuratorate:.
 Attempt to commit suicide, escape or escape after committing a crime;
There is a possibility of destruction, forged evidence or collusion.  After the People's Procuratorate decides to detain, it shall be executed by the public security department.

Review of the necessity of detention 
The 2012 amendments to the Criminal Procedure Law added a system for reviewing criminal suspects in custody after arrest. On 13 January 2016, the Supreme People’s Procuratorate issued the “Regulations on the People’s Procuratorate for Handling Custody Necessity Review Cases (Trial)”. The arrested criminal suspects and defendants  , May apply to the procuratorial organ for a review of the necessity of detention. If the procuratorial organ considers that detention is unnecessary after the review, it will recommend that the case-handling agency release it or change its compulsory measures.

During custody 
Criminal detention
The detention period is 3 days, and can be extended for 1–4 days with the approval of the administrative person in charge of the public security organ.  Suspects who commit crimes on the verge of committing crimes, committing multiple crimes, or ganging up to commit crimes can be extended for 30 days (up to 37 days). During the period of detention, it is ruled out that criminal suspects are released, If the procuratorate does not approve the arrest, he shall be released immediately.  If the procuratorate approves the arrest, it will go directly to the stage of investigation and custody.  Those who need to continue the investigation and meet the conditions for release on bail pending trial or residential surveillance shall be released on bail pending trial or residential surveillance in accordance with the law.

Detective Custody
The period of investigation and custody after the arrest of a criminal suspect shall not exceed two months.  Cases that are complicated and cannot be terminated after the time limit expires may be extended for one month with the approval of the People’s Procuratorate at the next higher level.
If the investigation cannot be terminated after the expiration of the preceding article, it may be extended for two months with the approval or decision of the People’s Procuratorate of the province, autonomous region, or municipality directly under the Central Government.
Major and complicated cases in remote areas with very inconvenient transportation
Major criminal group case
Severe and complicated cases of fleeing crimes
The crime involves a wide range of major and complicated cases with difficulty in obtaining evidence.

Extended Custody
Extended Custody is based on the "Criminal Procedure Law of the People's Republic of China", for criminal suspects and defendants in the investigation, review and prosecution, trial stage custodial time exceeded  Illegal acts that stipulate the time limit of custody by law.  If the criminal suspect or defendant has been detained for more than five years, and the case is still in the stages of investigation, review and prosecution, first instance, and second instance, it is a case of'prolonged detention without decision'.  Prolonged unresolved cases may also have overdue custody, or there may be no overdue custody after legal procedures have been approved.

According to the "Criminal Procedural Law of the People's Republic of China", the investigative agency’s criminal detention period for criminal suspects is 30 days. In addition, there can be a maximum period of 7 days for arrest and review.  When the case is transferred from the public security organ to the procuratorate and the court, the procedure of "changing custody" must be carried out in accordance with the law.

If a criminal suspect or defendant is found to have been detained for an extended period of time, if the detention center fails to promptly report to the People’s Procuratorate in writing and notify the case-handling agency, the procuratorate stationed in the detention center shall report to the chief prosecutor for approval and issue a "Notice of Correction of Illegal Laws" to the detention center in the name of this court.

Republic of Ireland
In the Republic of Ireland, a person brought before the District Court and charged may be either released on bail or held on remand while awaiting trial. Typically this is for less than 8 days, but it can be as long as 30 days. Cloverhill Prison is the main remand prison in the Dublin area. If the prisoner's court appearance is in 4 days or less, they may be held at a Garda station.

In recent years, there has been an increase in the number of prisoners held on remand for minor offences, Fr. Peter McVerry noting that remand was almost always used if the defendant was homeless or severely mentally ill.

United States 
In the United States, a person is protected by the federal Constitution from being held in prison unlawfully.  The right to have one's detention reviewed by a judge is called habeas corpus. The U.S. Constitution states that "The Privilege of the Writ of Habeas Corpus shall not be suspended, unless when in Cases of Rebellion or Invasion the public Safety may require it". A declaration of a state of emergency can suspend the right to habeas corpus.

The Sixth Amendment requires criminal defendants to be "informed of the nature and cause of the accusation". The U.S. Bill of Rights thus grants some protection against being held without criminal charge, subject to the courts' interpretation of what due process means.  Federal authorities have also exercised the power to arrest people on the basis of being a material witness.  Involuntary commitment of the mentally ill is another category of detention without criminal prosecution, but the right of habeas corpus still applies.  The scope of such detentions is also limited by the Bill of Rights.

The executive's military powers have been used to justify holding enemy combatants as prisoners of war, unlawful combatants, and civilian internees; the latter two practices have been controversial, especially with regard to the indefinite detention implied by uncertainty as to when the "War on Terror" might be declared to have ended. Administrative detention, a term applied to many of these categories, is also used to imprison illegal immigrants.

Sweden 
In Swedish law, häktning is a pre-trial supervision measure, where a suspect can be jailed for crimes that have a prison term of at least one year. There are two degrees of suspicion: reasonable suspicion is the lower level, and probable cause is the higher level.

Remanding occurs if the committed crime has a statutory minimum penalty of at least one year, and includes:
a risk of recidivism,
a risk that the suspect will destroy evidence or otherwise affect the investigation of the crime, or
a risk that the suspect will flee prosecution or punishment.

Alternatively, remanding occurs for probable cause suspicion (and lesser crimes) when:
the suspect does not have permanent residence in Sweden, and can be assumed to want to leave Sweden.
the identity of the suspect is not established, if the suspect refuses to provide it or has given a false identity.

A person may be held in custody normally for no more than 14 days (or seven days if the degree of suspicion is reasonable suspicion). After the period, a new hearing is held to determine whether or not häktning should be extended. For suspects under age 18, "serious reasons" for detention decisions are needed and should be notified to court. From July 2021, a person remanded under häktning cannot be held in custody for longer than six to nine months in total (three months for minors).

When a person is facing less serious crimes, they are given a summary penalty order by prosecutors.

A person who was remanded but was not sentenced or freed after trial is entitled to financial compensation, which is determined by the Chancellor of Justice. The compensation can vary, but it is usually 30,000 SEK for the first month; 20,000 SEK for every subsequent month, up to and including the sixth month; and 15,000 SEK for every month after that. Any loss of income is also compensated. In 2007, 1200 people were compensated.

If a prisoner is sentenced, the remand time counts as part of the prison time, such that less time remains after the trial.

The Committee for the Prevention of Torture of the Council of Europe has repeatedly criticised pre-trial detention in Sweden for the high percentage of cases where restrictions on communication are applied. In Sweden, communication restrictions include no visits, no telephone calls, no newspapers, and no TV.

Detention during trial 

The term "remand" may be used to describe the process of keeping a person in detention rather than granting bail. A prisoner who is denied, refused or unable to meet the conditions of bail, or who is unable to post bail, may be held in a prison on remand. Although remanded prisoners are usually detained separately from sentenced prisoners, due to prison overcrowding they are sometimes held in a shared accommodation with sentenced prisoners. Reasons for being held in custody on remand vary depending on the local legal system, but may include:

the suspect has been accused of carrying out a particularly serious offence
the suspect having previous convictions for similar offences
reasons to believe the suspect could leave the court's jurisdiction to avoid its trial and possible punishment
reasons to believe the suspect may destroy evidence or interfere with witnesses
the suspect is likely to commit further offences before the trial
the suspect is believed to be in danger from accomplices, victims, or vigilantes

In most countries, remand prisoners are considered innocent until proven guilty by a court and may be granted greater privileges than sentenced prisoners. For example, most jurisdictions that prohibit convicted criminals from voting in elections will still allow remand prisoners to vote, unless they have been disqualified from voting for some other reason. Other privileges commonly granted include:

wearing own clothes rather than prison uniform
keeping more personal possessions
being entitled to additional visiting hours per week
not being required to complete prison-related work or education

Not all remand prisons grant these privileges; in particular, remand prisoners are often forced to wear prison uniforms and denied additional visitation rights, supposedly for safety reasons, although some facilities allow remand prisoners to wear a uniform that is a different color or otherwise clearly distinguishable from the uniforms of convicted criminals. Often they are denied all visits and all newspaper and media access, for risk of interfering with the investigation, such as communicating a story with fellow remand prisoners.

Czech Republic  

Under Article 8 (5) of the Charter of Fundamental Rights and Basic Freedoms, which has the same legal standing as the Constitution, nobody shall be taken into custody except on the basis of a court decision, and for reasons and a detention period stipulated by the law.

Detailed rules of remand custody are contained in the Criminal Procedural Code. A person may be remanded in custody by the decision of a court only when a number of preconditions is met cumulatively:
 he or she has been charged with committing a crime which is punishable by  
 more than two years of imprisonment in case of intentionally committed crime, or
 more than three years of imprisonment in case of negligently committed crime,
 (the 2/3 years rule is subject to certain defined statutory exceptions, e.g. where a suspect has already been evading the proceedings) and
 there are reasonable grounds indicating that the alleged act was committed and it has all features of the given crime, and
 there are apparent reasons for suspicion, that the act was committed by the charged person, and
 because of the personality of the charged person, the nature of the crime and its gravity, the objective of the custody may not be reached by a different measure.

At the same time, there must be reasonable concern, that the charged person may either
 (a) escape or evade the criminal proceedings, or
 (b) influence witnesses or otherwise similarly frustrate the proceedings, or
 (c) continue criminal activity with which he or she was charged, or finish a criminal act he or she had attempted, or commit a criminal act he or she was preparing or threatening to commit.

The charged person may be remanded in custody subject to maximum terms as follows: 
 one year in cases of crimes which are dealt with by a single judge,
 two years in cases of crimes which are dealt with by a panel of three judges,
 three years in cases of felony crimes (i.e. intentional crimes punishable by a sentence with an upper jail term of at least 10 years)
 four years in cases punishable by an exceptional penalty (i.e. 20–30 years or life imprisonment)
one third of the maximum detention periods time may be exhausted in pre-trial proceedings and two thirds may be exhausted during the trial. Reaching the maximum time is always reason for immediate release.

An exception to the time limits above arises in cases of remand due to concern of (b) interfering with witnesses or similar frustration of proceedings, in which case the maximum pre-trial detention period may be only three months, except where the charged person has already been influencing witnesses or otherwise frustrating the proceedings.

The court must review the reasons for the pre-trial custody every three months and decide either to continue it, or to release the charged person. Both the prosecutor and the person in custody may file a complaint against any decision on custody, which leads to review by an appellate court.

Special rules of remand pertain to persons who are processed for extradition, e.g. illegal foreigners, those detained due to international (foreign) warrant or the European Arrest Warrant.

Conditions in Czech remand prisons 
In the Czech Republic, remand takes place in remand prisons or in separated sections of standard prisons. Remand prisons are often in city centres and appertain to court houses. Most remand prisons are over 80 years old, with some, like Pankrác Prison, being more than 125 years old. Men, women and juveniles are held separately. Also persons charged with committing different types of crimes (e.g. unintentional, intentional, violent, etc.) are held separately.
 
Deficiencies of remand prisons according to 2010 Czech ombudsman's report
 insufficient daylight
 too intensive nightlight
 insufficient space for out-walks
 lack of leisure activities
 lack of working opportunities
 presence of prison guards during health care delivery
 restricted access to telephone
Cells have capacity varying between 1–8 beds, with most having between 2–4 beds. Some remand prisons have rooms intended for watching TV, gyms or chapels, but these are exceptional mainly due to overcrowding and lack of space. All have special areas for interviews between the inmates and their attorneys, visiting rooms and courtyards for out-walks.

Each cell has a WC divided from the rest of the cell-space and running cold water. Each cell-mate has own bed, storage locker and chair.

Inmates which are held due to concern of influencing witnesses are held in isolation with very limited possibility of contact with other inmates as well as the outer world (apart from interviews with own attorneys).

At any given time in 2011, there were around 2.500 inmates in the Czech remand prisons (including ~170 women and ~45 juveniles), compared to some 20.500 convicted inmates (for 10,6 million population). The average length of remand custody is around 100 days, with few inmates spending in remand more than 2 years.

More than half of foreign inmates of the Czech remand prisons are from Slovakia, Ukraine and Vietnam. Other numerous foreigners are from Bulgaria, Moldova, North Macedonia, Poland, Romania, Russia and Serbia. When it comes to non-European states, there are numerous detainees from Nigeria, Algeria, Morocco, Uzbekistan, Kazakhstan and Mongolia. There are mostly only few individuals of other nationalities.

Republic of Ireland
In the Republic of Ireland, a person may also be held on remand during trial.

United Kingdom 
In England and Wales, a suspect may be remanded after charge if:
The suspect has been charged with a serious crime
The suspect has been convicted of a serious crime in the past
The suspect has breached bail conditions or failed to surrender either now or in the past
The police believe the suspect may not appear in court
The police believe the suspect may commit another crime if released on bail
Remanding a suspect following arrest and until their first hearing at a magistrates' court is a decision made by the police using the criteria set above. Any such person ‘remanded in police custody’ will be transported from the police cells to the next available sitting magistrate's court. This may be the same day, or may require the remanded individual to stay in police custody overnight or over the weekend. At the first hearing, the court will decide whether it necessary to remand the suspect until the end of the trial. If the suspect is not remanded the court may issue bail conditions for suspect to abide to until the trial. Adults will be held on court remand at a regular prison, while those below the age of 18 will be held at a secure centre for young people. If a remanded suspect is convicted and given a prison sentence, the time they spent on remand is deducted from the length of the sentence. In some cases, a convicted suspect has been released immediately after being sentenced, if the time they spent on remand was longer than or equal to the sentence they received.

United States 
The Eighth Amendment to the United States Constitution prohibits excessive bail. Under the US Code, pretrial detention of federal suspects is allowed only under certain circumstances, such as when the defendant is a danger to witnesses or jurors.

Impact 
Studies of pretrial detention in the United States have found that it significantly increases the probability of conviction and the length of sentences, largely because individuals who would otherwise be acquitted in trial enter guilty pleas. Studies have found that pretrial detention also lowers the defendants' prospects in the labour market, and contributes to poverty traps whereby individuals unable to pay bail end up accruing more debt. A 2017 study, using data from New York City, found that pretrial detention increases the likelihood of recidivism.

Criticisms 
Pre-trial detention has been described as a "necessary evil". A 2013 report by the Centre for Crime and Justice Studies concluded that pre-trial detention was being overused worldwide, and that most were being held for minor crimes. A 2014 report by the Open Society Foundations called it a "massive and widely ignored pattern of human rights abuse".

A person must be found guilty "beyond reasonable doubt" in order to be convicted at a trial. However, pre-trial detention requires a lower threshold such as "reasonable suspicion". In most countries, the prosecution only need to prove that the charges are well-founded and that there is a sufficient threat that the defendant will commit another crime or undermine the judicial process. In the United States, the system of money bail means that a defendant can be detained even if neither of these threats can be identified, solely because nobody was willing or able to deposit the bail money for them.

In the Harvard Law Review, Stephanie Bibas also noted its impact on plea bargaining. Pretrial detention alters a defendant's incentives by making his or her best-case scenario not zero days in jail, but the length of time served pretrial. Therefore, a defendant may be more likely to plead guilty if the chance of acquittal is low, or if the expected sentence on a guilty plea is less than the amount of jail time that would be served pretrial. Pretrial detainees may also find it harder to mount an effective defence. This coercive effect on downstream outcomes such as taking plea bargains has been empirically demonstrated to be especially strong for people held pretrial on low-level charges (i.e., misdemeanors). 

The Open Society Foundation report also concluded that some detainees face worse conditions than convicted prisoners; for example the suicide rate is three times higher worldwide.

In the U.S., pretrial detention has been found to negatively affect local labor markets, especially in areas with high percentages of Black residents, suggesting racialized collateral impacts on employment. 

The July 2022 result of a New York Times examination of handwritten lists of names of Egyptian civilians imprisoned indefinitely in pre-trial detention exposed the mockery of the country’s legal limits. There have been no public records of the number of detainees held in pre-trial detention, but according to the Times analysis, more than 4,500 people were held under such system of pre-trial detention, some even for more than six months. The Egyptian judicial system has been criticized for falsely charging political opponents of Abdel Fattah el-Sisi for ‘terrorist links’. Often no formal complaint is filed or evidence is presented, preventing detainees from legally fighting in their defense before getting locked up. Meanwhile, human rights groups estimate that at least 60,000 political prisoners have been detained in Egypt, including pretrial detainees and those tried and sentenced for suspicion of having terror links or intolerable political points of view.

See also

 Arbitrary arrest and detention
 Defence Regulation 18B
 Extrajudicial detention
 Immigration detention
 Law enforcement agency powers
 Nightwalker Statute
 Powers of the police in England and Wales
 Quasi-criminal
 Restorative justice
 Security certificate
 Summary jurisdiction
 Unlawful combatant

References

Criminal law
Criminal procedure
Law enforcement agency powers
Law enforcement terminology